Southside is a city located in Etowah County in the U.S. state of Alabama. It is included in the Gadsden Metropolitan Statistical Area. It incorporated in 1957. The population was 8,412 at the time of the 2010 United States Census.

History
Southside was first settled in 1850 as a small rural community with townships such as Green Valley, Cedar Bend, and Pilgrims Rest, and the area which is now the city of Southside was formed when they merged together. Early Southside's primary source of income was agricultural. Green Valley was the early center of Southside’s industry; as its grist mill, blacksmith and sorghum mill were located there. The area’s cotton gin was located at Brannon Springs and State Highway 77.

Geography
Southside is located in southern Etowah County on the south side of the Coosa River. A small part of the city extends south into Calhoun County. The city is in the foothills of the southern Appalachian Mountains.

Demographics

2020 census

As of the 2020 United States census, there were 9,426 people, 3,284 households, and 2,314 families residing in the city.

2010 census
As of the 2010 United States Census, there were 8,412 people, 3,228 households, and 2,524 families residing in the city. The racial makeup of the city was 96.54% White, 1.46% Black or African American, 0.18% Native American, 0.67% Asian, 0.4% from other races, and 0.71% from two or more races. 1.27% of the population were Hispanic or Latino of any race.

There were 3,228 households, out of which 35.9% had children under the age of 18 living with them, 65.86% were married couples living together, 9.08% had a female householder with no husband present, and 21.81% were non-families. 19.39% of all households were made up of individuals, and 7.93% had someone living alone who was 65 years of age or older. The average household size was 2.58 and the average family size was 2.94.

Age distribution was 26.9% 19 years or younger, 4.5% from 20 to 24, 23% from 25 to 39, 36.7% from 45 to 64, and 13.4% who were 65 years of age or older. The median age was 40.1 years. For every 100 females, there were 96.03 males. For every 100 females age 18 and over, there were 93.34 males.

As of the 2000 United States Census, the median income for a household in the city was $52,464, and the median income for a family was $58,427. Males had a median income of $41,664 versus $29,375 for females. The per capita income for the city was $21,936. About 2.2% of families and 3.6% of the population were below the poverty line, including 3.1% of those under age 18 and 5.4% of those age 65 or over.

Education
The city is served by the Etowah County Board of Education. The city has one elementary school, one high school, and shares a middle school with neighboring Rainbow City. Students also have the option of attending schools in the Gadsden City school system.

References

External links
Official website

Cities in Alabama
Cities in Etowah County, Alabama
Populated places established in 1850